Bobby Glendon Wood (September 21, 1935 – January 12, 2023) was an American politician.

Life and career
Wood was born in Fyffe, Alabama on September 21, 1935. He lived in Harrison, Tennessee, with his wife and family, and was involved with the insurance business and the Chattanooga Glass Company. Wood served in the Tennessee House of Representatives from 1976 to 2004 and was a Republican. Wood died at his home in Harrison on January 12, 2023, at the age of 87.

References

1935 births
2023 deaths
People from DeKalb County, Alabama
People from Hamilton County, Tennessee
Businesspeople from Tennessee
Republican Party members of the Tennessee House of Representatives